KQKK (101.9 FM, "KQ102 The Arrow") is a classic hits radio station licensed to serve Walker, Minnesota, United States.  The station is owned by De La Hunt Broadcasting and the broadcast license is held by Carol J. Delahunt.  The station's transmitter and tower are east of town on Highway 200.

KQKK broadcasts a classic hits music format, including syndicated programming from Westwood One.

History
This station received its original construction permit from the Federal Communications Commission on April 9, 1998.  The new station was assigned the KQKK call sign by the FCC on May 9, 1998.  KQKK received its license to cover from the FCC on December 14, 1999.

On May 11, 2022, KQKK changed formats from adult contemporary to classic hits, branded as "101.9 The Arrow".

Previous logo

References

External links
KK Radio Network official website

Radio stations in Minnesota
Classic hits radio stations in the United States
Cass County, Minnesota
Radio stations established in 1998